Yordan Parushev (30 June 1958 in Sliven, Bulgaria – 15 December 2011), was a contemporary Bulgarian artist.
Graduated in Painting Department /Veliko Tarnovo University /, with the main subject - painting class Pamukchiev Stanislav's, 1983.
He has specialized in the Repin Academy in St. Petersburg, Russia and the Cite Internationale Arts in Paris, France.
Associate professor of art history and art of Veliko Tarnovo University "St." St. Cyril and Methoudius ".
Member of the Union of Bulgarian Artists.

Technique
Parushev works in the field of painting, and in collage. Develop your technique collage by layering a thin, translucent paper without using any paint. Achieves a rich multi-image surface as zhivopisva with colored paper, which in combination with expressive paintings make abstract compositions of Yordan Parushev difficult to achieve a combination of sensual and sensory-mental-spiritual. Deal with different types paperIncluding napkins and corrugated, Sawdust, wood bark.

There are over 45 solo exhibitions at home and abroad. Participated in over 300 group exhibitions of contemporary Bulgarian art Bulgaria, Austria, Germany, India, Belgium, France, Norway, Poland, Russia, Turkey, Serbia, Korea, Portugal, Slovakia, Netherlands, Croatia. His works are involved in prestigious selections of contemporary Bulgarian
Awards: 14 awards for fine arts.

Works are owned by:
National Gallery, the Sofia City Art Gallery, art galleries in Rousse, Sliven, Shumen, Pleven, Razgrad, Smolyan, Dobrich.
Museum of Contemporary Art - Seoul, Korea, Center for Documentation of collage - Sergin, France, National Palace of Culture Collection - Sofia, French Cultural Institute Collection - Sofia, Cyril and Methodius "Collection - Sofia," Open Society "- Sliven.
Private collections in Bulgaria, the United States, Russia, Britain, Germany, France, Turkey, Norway, Finland, Greece, Belarus, Belgium, Netherlands, Slovakia, Poland, Portugal, Luxemburg.

References

1958 births
2011 deaths
Bulgarian painters
People from Sliven